Six vessels of the Royal Navy have been named HMS Ready:

  (ex-Minerva) was a 12-gun gunboat launched in 1797 and sold in 1802.
  was a  launched in 1856 and broken up in 1864.
  was a 4-gun gunboat launched in 1872, renamed Drudge in 1894 and sold in 1920.
  was a Q-ship purchased in 1915 and renamed Probus in 1916.
  was an  launched in 1916 and scrapped in 1926.
  was an  launched in 1943, sold to Belgium in 1951 and renamed Jan Van Haverbeke, and scrapped in 1961.

References

Royal Navy ship names